The following is a list of notable architects – well-known individuals with a large body of published work or notable structures, which point to an article in the English Wikipedia.

Early architects

Aa (Middle Kingdom), Egyptian
Amenhotep, son of Hapu (14th c. BC), Egyptian
Anthemius of Tralles (c. 474 – 533–558), Greek
Apollodorus of Damascus (2nd c. AD), Damascus
Aristobulus of Cassandreia (c. 375 – 301 BC), Greek
Callicrates (mid-5th c. BC), Greek
Hermodorus of Salamis (fl. 146–102 BC), Cypriot
Hippodamus of Miletus (498–408 BC), Greek
Ictinus (fl. mid-5th c. BC), Greek
Imhotep (fl. late 27th c. BC), Egyptian
Ineni (18th Dynasty of Egypt), Egyptian
Isidore of Miletus (6th c. AD), Byzantine Greek
Marcus Agrippa (63–12 BC), Roman
Mnesicles (mid-5th c. BC), Athenian
Rabirius (1st–2nd cc. AD), Roman
Senemut (18th Dynasty of Egypt), Egyptian
Vitruvius (c. 80–70 BC – post–15 BC), Roman
Yu Hao (喻皓, fl 970), Chinese

Narasimhavarman II  (695-729 CE), South India
Perumthachan(9th c.AD), South India

12th-century architects

Abbot Suger (c. 1081–1151), French
William the Englishman (1174 – c. 1214), English
William of Sens (died 1180), French

13th-century architects

Arnolfo di Cambio (c. 1240–1300/1310), Italian
Villard de Honnecourt (fl. 13th c.), French
Robert de Luzarches (fl. late 12th – early 13th c.), French
Jean d'Orbais (c. 1175–1231), French
Radovan (fl. 13th c.), Croatian

14th-century architects

Filippo Calendario (died 1355), Venetian
Jacopo Celega (died pre–1386), Italian
Taddeo Gaddi (c. 1290–1366), Florentine
Giotto di Bondone (c. 1267–1337), Florentine
Anđeo Lovrov Zadranin (fl. mid–14th c.), Croatian
Juraj Lovrov Zadranin (fl. 14th c.), Croatian
Heinrich Parler (c. 1310–1371), German
Johann Parler (c. 1359–1405/6), Bohemian
Peter Parler (c. 1333–1399), Bohemian
Wenzel Parler (c. 1360–1404), Bohemian

15th-century architects

Leon Battista Alberti (1404–1472), Italian
Andrea Alessi (1425–1505), Dalmatian
Marko Andrijić (c. 1470 – post-1507), Dalmatian
Donato Bramante (1444–1514), Italian
Filippo Brunelleschi (1377–1446), Italian
Mauro Codussi (1440–1504), Italian/Venetian
Aristotele Fioravanti (c. 1415 or 1420 – c. 1486), Italian/Russian 
Niccolò di Giovanni Fiorentino (1418–1506), Italian/Dalmatian
Juan Guas (c. 1430/1433 – c. 1496), Spanish
Luciano Laurana (c. 1420–1479), Venetian
Annibale Maggi detto Da Bassano (fl. 1490s), Venetian
Paskoje Miličević (c. 1440–1516), Croatian
Michelozzo Michelozzi (1396–1472), Italian
Bernardo Rossellino (1409–1464), Italian
Giorgio da Sebenico (c. 1410–1473), Venetian
Jacob van Thienen (fl. early 15th c.), Flemish
Leonardo da Vinci (1452–1519), Italian

16th-century architects

Antonio Abbondi (fl. early 16th c.), Italian
Galeazzo Alessi (1512–1572), Italian
Bartolomeo Ammanati (1511–1592), Italian
 Michelangelo Buonarroti (1475–1564), Italian
Girolamo Cassar (c. 1520 – c. 1592), Maltese
Vittorio Cassar (c. 1550 – c. 1609), Maltese
Guglielmo dei Grigi (1485–1550), Italian
Nikolaus Gromann (1500–1566), German
Juan de Herrera (1530–1597), Spanish
Adam Kraft (1460–1509), German
Francesco Laparelli (1521–1570), Italian
Pirro Ligorio (1512–1583), Italian
Philibert de l'Orme (1514–1570), French
Giovanni Magenta (1565–1635), Italian
Hans Hendrik van Paesschen (c. 1510–1582), Flemish
Andrea Palladio (1508–1580), Italian
Antonio da Sangallo the Elder (c. 1453–1534), Italian
Antonio da Sangallo the Younger (1484–1546), Italian
Michele Sammicheli (1484–1559), Venetian
Raffaello Santi (Raphael) (1483–1520), Italian
Vincenzo Scamozzi (1548–1616), Italian
Sebastiano Serlio (1475–1554), Italian
Koca Mimar Sinan Agha (1489–1588), Ottoman Armenian
Friedrich Sustris (1540–1599), Italian/Dutch
Lambert Sustris (1518–1584), Dutch
Pellegrino Tibaldi (1527–1596), Italian
Giorgio Vasari (1511–1574), Italian
Giacomo Barozzi da Vignola (1507–1573), Italian
Postnik Yakovlev (fl. mid-16th c.), Russian

17th-century architects

Gian Lorenzo Bernini (1598–1680), Italian
Francesco Borromini (1599–1667), Italian
Ustad Ahmad Lahauri (fl. 17th c.), Indian
Jacob van Campen (1596–1657), Dutch
Pietro da Cortona (1596 or 1597–1669), Italian
Jan Zygmunt Deybel (c. 1685–1752), German
Johann Dientzenhofer (1663–1726), German
Leonhard Dientzenhofer (1660–1707), German
Tumas Dingli (1591–1666), Maltese
Léopold Durand (1666–1746), French
Pietro Paolo Floriani (1585–1638), Italian
Lorenzo Gafà (1639–1703), Maltese
Guarino Guarini (1624–1683), Italian
Jules Hardouin-Mansart (1646–1708), French
Elias Holl (1573–1646), German
Inigo Jones (1573–1652), English
Louis Le Vau (1612–1670), French
Baldassarre Longhena (1598–1682), Italian
Carlo Maderno (1556–1629), Italian
François Mansart (1598–1666), French
Johann Arnold Nering (c.1659?–1695), German
Francesco Antonio Picchiatti (1619–1694), Italian
Matthäus Daniel Pöppelmann (1662–1736), German
Carlo Rainaldi (1611–1691), Italian
Andreas Schlüter (c.1659–1714), German
Nicodemus Tessin the Younger (1654–1728), Swedish
John Webb (1611–1672), English
Elizabeth Mytton Wilbraham (1632–1705), English
Christopher Wren (1632–1723), English

18th-century architects

Robert Adam (1728–1792), Scottish
William Adam (1689–1748), Scottish
Cosmas Damian Asam (1686–1739), German
Egid Quirin Asam (1692–1750), German
Joseph Bonomi the Elder (1739–1808), Italian
Étienne-Louis Boullée (1728–1799)
William Buckland (1734–1774), English/American
Colen Campbell (1676–1729), Scottish
John Carr of York (1723–1807), English
Richard Cassels (1690–1751), German
William Chambers (1723–1796), Swedish/Scottish
François de Cuvilliés (1695–1768), Netherlandish/German
Christoph Dientzenhofer (1655–1722), German
Kilian Ignaz Dientzenhofer (1689–1751), German
Laurent-Benoît Dewez (1731–1812), Netherlandish
John Douglas (c. 1709–1788), Scottish
Nicolai Eigtved (1701–1754), Danish
Johann Bernhard Fischer von Erlach (1656–1723), Austrian
Johann Michael Fischer (1692–1766), German
Pierre François Léonard Fontaine (1762–1853), French
Ange-Jacques Gabriel (1698–1782), French
Alessandro Galilei (1691–1737), Italian
John Gwynn (1713–1786), English
Abraham Hargrave (1755–1808), English/Irish
Peter Harrison (1716–1775), American
Nicholas Hawksmoor (1661–1736), English
Johann Lukas von Hildebrandt (1668–1745), Austrian
James Hoban (1755–1831), Irish/American
John Hutchison, Scottish
Thomas Ivory (1709–1779), English
Nicolas-Henri Jardin (1720–1799), French (in Denmark)
Thomas Jefferson (1743–1826), American
Richard Jupp (1728–1799), English
Filippo Juvarra (1678–1736), Italian
William Kent (1685–1748), English
Benjamin Latrobe (1764–1820), English/American
Claude-Nicolas Ledoux (1736–1806), French
Giacomo Leoni (1686–1746), Italian
Joseph Christian Lillie (1760–1827), Danish
Johann Friedrich Ludwig (João Frederico Ludovice) (1673–1752), German
Giorgio Massari (1687–1766), Italian
Josef Munggenast (1680–1741), Austrian
Robert Mylne (1733–1811), Scottish
Ivan Fyodorovich Michurin (1700–1763), Russian
Balthasar Neumann (c. 1687–1733), German
Mateus Vicente de Oliveira (1706–86), Portuguese
Giovanni Paolo Pannini (1691–1765), Italian
Edward Lovett Pearce (1699–1733), Irish
Charles Percier (1764–1838), French
Giuseppe Piermarini (1734–1808), Italian
Paolo Posi (1708–1776), Italian
Jakob Prandtauer (1660–1726), Austrian
Giacomo Quarenghi (1744–1817), Italian/Russian
Joseph-Jacques Ramée (1764–1842), Italian
Bartolomeo Rastrelli (1700–1771), Italian/Russian
Charles Ribart (fl. 1776–1783), French
Antonio Rinaldi (c. 1710–1794), Italian
Nicola Salvi (1697–1751), Italian
Thomas Sandby (1721–1798), English
Jan Blažej Santini-Aichel (1677–1723), Austrian/Czech
Michael Searles (1750–1813), English
Jacques-Germain Soufflot (1713–1780), French
Manuel Caetano de Sousa (1738–1802), Portuguese
William Thornton (1759–1828), English/American
Lauritz de Thurah (1706–1759), Danish
Mary Townley (1753–1839), English
Domenico Trezzini (1670–1734), Swiss/Italian
John Vanbrugh (1664–1726), English
Luigi Vanvitelli (1700–1773), Italian
Bernardo Vittone (1704–1770), Italian
John Wood, the Elder (1704–1754), English
John Wood, the Younger (1728–1782), English
James Wyatt (1746–1813), English
Dominikus Zimmermann (1685–1766), German

19th-century architects

A–M

Dankmar Adler (1844–1900), American
Frank Shaver Allen (1860–1934), American
Henry Austin (1804–1891), American
Alphonse Balat (1819–1895), Belgian
William Swinden Barber (1832–1908), English
Sir Charles Barry (1795–1860), English
Charles Barry, Jr. (1823–1900), English
Edward Middleton Barry (1830–1880), English
Frédéric Auguste Bartholdi (1834–1904), French
Carlo Bassi (1807–1856), Italian
Asher Benjamin (1773–1845), American
Hendrik Beyaert (1823–1894), Belgian
Charles Bickel (1852–1921), American
Joseph Blick (1867–1947), American
Edward Blore (1787–1879), English
Camillo Boito (1836–1914), Italian
Ignatius Bonomi (1787–1870), English
Ferdinando Bonsignore (1760–1843), Italian
R. Newton Brezee (1851–1929), American
Gridley James Fox Bryant (1816–1899), American
David Bryce (1803–1876), Scottish
Aleksandar Bugarski (1835–1891), Serbian
Charles Bulfinch (1763–1844), American
William Burges (1827–1881), English
William Burn (1789–1870), Scottish
Decimus Burton (1800–1881), English
J. Cleaveland Cady (1837–1919), American
Carrère and Hastings (1885–1929), American
Cesar Castellani (died 1905), Maltese
Basil Champneys (1842–1935), English
Edward Clark (1822–1902), American
Adolf Cluss (1825–1905), American
S. N. Cooke (1882–1964), English
Lewis Cubitt (1799–1883), English
Thomas Cubitt (1788–1855), English
Pierre Cuypers (1827–1921), Dutch
Alexander Jackson Davis (1803–1892), American
George Devey (1820–1886), English
John Dobson (1787–1865), English
Thomas Leverton Donaldson (1795–1885), English
Henry Engelbert (1826–1901), American
Kolyu Ficheto (1800–1881), Bulgarian
George A. Frederick (1842–1924), American
Watson Fothergill (1841–1928), English
James Fowler (1828–1892), English
Thomas Fuller (1823–1898), Canadian
Frank Furness (1839–1912), American
Charles Garnier (1825–1898), French
Friedrich von Gärtner (1791–1847), German
Edward William Godwin (1833–1886), English
George Enoch Grayson (1833–1912), English
Samuel Hannaford (1835–1911), American
Theophil Hansen (1813–1891), Danish/Austrian
Philip Hardwick (1792–1870), English
Philip Charles Hardwick (1822–1892), English
William Alexander Harvey (1874–1951), English
Thomas Hastings (1860–1929), American
Victor Horta (1861–1947), Belgian
William Hosking FSA (1800–1861), English
Heinrich Hübsch (1795–1863), German
Samuel Huckel (1858–1917), American
Richard Hunt (1827–1895), American
Benno Janssen (1874–1964), American
Giuseppe Jappelli (1783–1852), Italian
William LeBaron Jenney (1832–1907), American
Sir Horace Jones (1819–1887), English
Emilijan Josimović (1823–1897), Serbian
Abdallah Khan (fl. 1810–1850), Persian
Leo von Klenze (1784–1864), German
John A. B. Koch (1845–1928), Australian
Henri Labrouste (1801–1875), French
Barthelemy Lafon (1769–1820), American
Richard Lane (1795–1880), English
Benjamin Henry Latrobe (1764–1820), American
Robert Lawson (1833–1902), New Zealander
Charles F. Lembke (1865–1925), American
Joseph Christian Lillie (1760–1827), Danish
Alexander Wadsworth Longfellow, Jr. (1854–1934), American
Sara Losh (1785–1853), English
Richard Lucae (1829–1879), German
Charles-François Mandar (1757–1844), French
Charles Follen McKim (1847–1909), American
Samuel McIntire (1757–1811), American
Enrico Marconi (1792–1863), Italian
Leandro Marconi (1834–1919), Polish
Oskar Marmorek (1863–1909), Austro-Hungarian
Frederick Marrable (1819–1872), English
Robert Mills (1781–1855), American
Josef Mocker (1835–1899), Bohemian
Auguste de Montferrand (1786–1858), French
Julia Morgan (1872–1957), American
William Morris (1834–1906), English
Alfred B. Mullett (1834–1890), American

N–Z

John Nash (1752–1835), English
Atanasije Nikolić (1803–1882), Serbian
Joseph Maria Olbrich (1867–1908), Austrian
Frederick Law Olmsted (1822–1903), American
Frederick J. Osterling (1865–1934), American
Edward Graham Paley (1823–1895), English
Alexander Parris (1780–1852), American
Joseph Paxton (1803–1865), English
John Wornham Penfold (1828–1909), English
Sir James Pennethorne, English
Francis Penrose (1817–1903), English
Friedrich Ludwig Persius (1803–1845), German
Francis Petre (1847–1918), New Zealand
Albert Pretzinger (b. 1863, death date unknown), American
Will Price (1855–1916), American
Augustus Pugin (1812–1852), English
E. W. Pugin (1834–1875), English
Peter Paul Pugin (1851–1904), English
Joseph-Jacques Ramée (1764–1842), French
Charles Reed (1814–1859), English
Charles Reeves (1815–1866), English
James Renwick, Jr. (1818–1895), American
Henry Hobson Richardson (1838–1886), American
Thomas Rickman (1776–1841), English
Eduard Riedel (1813–1885), German
Antonio Rivas Mercado (1853–1927), Mexican
Robert S. Roeschlaub  (1843–1923), American
Isaiah Rogers (1800–1869), American
John Root (1850–1891), American
Carlo Rossi (1775–1849), Italian/Russian
Archimedes Russell (1840–1915), American
Octave van Rysselberghe (1855–1929), Belgian
John Holloway Sanders (1825–1884), English
Frederick C. Sauer (1860–1942), German/American
George Gilbert Scott (1811–1878), English
George Gilbert Scott Jr. (1839–1897), English
Karl Friedrich Schinkel (1781–1841), German
Gottfried Semper (1803–1879), German
Edmund Sharpe (1809–1877), English
Joseph Lyman Silsbee (1848–1913), American
Jacob Snyder (1823–1890), American
John Soane (1848–1913), American
August Soller (1805–1853), German 
Vasily P. Stasov (1769–1848), Russian
J. J. Stevenson (1831–1908), Scottish
Heinrich Strack (1805–1880), German
George Edmund Street (1824–1881), English
William Strickland (1788–1854), American
Friedrich August Stüler (1800–1865), German
Louis Sullivan (1856–1924), American
Henry Tanner (1849–1935), English
Thomas Alexander Tefft (1826–1859), American
Thomas Telford (1757–1834), Scottish
Samuel Sanders Teulon (1812–1873), English
Constantine Andreyevich Ton (1794–1881), Russian
Clair Tisseur (1827–1896), French
Ithiel Town (1784–1844), American
Silvanus Trevail (1851–1903), English
William Tubby (1858–1944), American
Richard Upjohn (1802–1878), English/American
Calvert Vaux (1824–1925), English/American
Eugène Viollet-le-Duc (1814–1879), French
Otto Wagner (1841–1918), Austrian
Thomas U. Walter (1804–1887), American
Alfred Waterhouse (1830–1905), English
George Webster (1797–1864), English
John Dodsley Webster (1840–1913), English
Stanford White (1853–1906), American
William Wilkins (1778–1839), English
Frederick Clarke Withers (1828–1901), English/American 
William Halsey Wood (1855–1897), American
Thomas Worthington (1826–1909), English
Thomas Henry Wyatt (1807–1880), Irish/English
Edward Alexander Wyon (1842–1872), English
Ammi B. Young (1798–1874), American
Nikola Živković (1792–1870), Serbian

20th-century architects

A–C

Alvar Aalto (1898–1976), Finland
Max Abramovitz (1908–2004), US
David Adler (1882–1949), US
Gerard Pieter Adolfs (1898–1968), Dutch East Indies
Charles N. Agree (1897–1982), Detroit, Michigan, US
Walter W. Ahlschlager (1887–1965), US
Franco Albini (1905–1977), Italy
Christopher Alexander (born 1936), Austria
Tadao Ando (born 1941), Japan
Paul Andreu (1938–2018), France
Edmund Anscombe (1874–1948), New Zealand
Milan Antonović (1850–1929)
Siah Armajani (1939–2020), Iran
Raul de Armas (born 1941), Cuba
João Batista Vilanova Artigas (1915–1985), Brazil
Hisham N. Ashkouri (born 1948), US
Charles Herbert Aslin (1893–1959), UK
Gunnar Asplund (1885–1940), Sweden
Ian Athfield (1940–2015), New Zealand
Fritz Auer (born 1933), Germany
Gae Aulenti (1927–2012), Italy
Carlo Aymonino (1926–2010), Italy
Rafiq Azam, Bangladesh
Laurie Baker (1917–2007), UK/India
Sixto Durán Ballén (1921–2016), US
Lina Bo Bardi (1914–1992), Italy/Brazil
Edward Larrabee Barnes (1915–2004), US
Howard R. Barr (1910–2002), US
Luis Barragán (1902–1988), Mexico
Fred Bassetti (1917–2013), US
Garry Baverstock  (born 1949), Australia
Geoffrey Bawa (1919–2003), Sri Lanka
Isobel Hogg Kerr Beattie (1900–1970), UK
Welton Becket (1902–1969), US
Claud Beelman (1883–1963), US
Adolf Behne (1885–1948), Germany
Peter Behrens (1868–1940), Germany
Pietro Belluschi (1899–1994), US
Hendrik Petrus Berlage (1856–1934), Netherlands
Mordechai Benshemesh (1911–1993), Australia
Antonio Bilbao La Vieja (1892–1980), Argentina
Titus de Bobula (1878–1961)
Ricardo Bofill (born 1939), Spain
Oriol Bohigas (born 1925), Spain
Gottfried Böhm (1920–2021), Germany
J. Max Bond, Jr. (1935–2009), US
Dariush Borbor (born 1934), Iran
Mario Botta (born 1943), Switzerland
Claude Fayette Bragdon (1866–1946), US
C.A. "Peter" Bransgrove (1914–1966), Tanganyika/Tanzania
Marcel Breuer (1902–1981), Hungary
Halldóra Briem (1913–1993), Iceland
Gordon Bunshaft (1909–1990), US
John Burgee (born 1933), US
Daniel Burnham (1846–1912), US
Santiago Calatrava (born 1951), Spain
Peter Calthorpe (born 1949), US
Alberto Campo Baeza (born 1946), Spain
Sir Hugh Casson (1910–1999), UK
James Chapman-Taylor (1958–1978), UK/New Zealand
Ethel Charles (1871–1962), UK
Jorge Ferreira Chaves (1920–1982), Portugal
Ann R. Chaintreuil (born 1947), United States
Serge Chermayeff (1900–1996), Chechnya/UK
David Chipperfield (born 1953), UK
Wells Coates (1895–1958), UK/Canada
Josep Antoni Coderch (1913–1984), Spain
Charles A. Cofield (born -), US
Coleman Coker (born 1951), US
Mary Colter (1869–1958), US
Peter Cook (born 1936), UK
Isadore (Issie) Coop (1926–2003), Canada 
Le Corbusier (1887–1965), Switzerland/France
Ernest Cormier (1885–1980), Canada
Charles Correa (1930–2015), India
Lúcio Costa (1902–1998), Brazil
Ralph Adams Cram (1863–1942), US
Charles Howard Crane (1885–1952), US
Paul Philippe Cret (1876–1945), France, US
Louis Curtiss (1865–1924), US
Kirtland Cutter (1860–1939), US

D–G

Justus Dahinden (1925–2020), Switzerland
Karl Damschen (born 1942), Germany
Raimondo Tommaso D'Aronco (1857–1932), Italy
Miša David (1942–2000), Yugoslavia
Giancarlo De Carlo (1919–2005), Italy
Frederic Joseph DeLongchamps (1882–1969), US
François Deslaugiers (1934–2009), France
Jack Diamond (born 1932), South Africa/Canada
Filipe Oliveira Dias (1963–2014), Portugal
Theo van Doesburg (1883–1931), Netherlands
B. V. Doshi (born 1927), India
Alden B. Dow (1904–1983), US
Jane Drew (1911–1996), UK
Andrés Duany (born 1949), US
Max Dudler (born 1949), Switzerland/Germany
Michael Middleton Dwyer (born 1954), US
Willem Marinus Dudok (1884–1974), Netherlands
Arthur Dyson (born 1940), US
H. Kempton Dyson (1880–1944), UK
Charles Eames (1907–1978), US
Ray Eames (1912–1988), US
John Eberson (1875–1964), Romania/USA
Peter Eisenman (born 1932), US
George Grant Elmslie (1869–1952), US
Richard England (born 1937), Malta
Arthur Erickson (1924–2009), Canada
Raymond Erith (1904–1973), US
Aldo van Eyck (1918–1999), Netherlands
Hassan Fathy (1900–1989), Egypt
Sverre Fehn (1924–2009), Norway
Arthur Fehr (1904–1969), US
Hermann Finsterlin (1887–1973), Germany
Theodor Fischer (1862–1938), Germany
Harold H. Fisher (1901–2005), US
Kay Fisker (1893–1965), Denmark
O'Neil Ford (1905–1982), US
Mohammad Foyez Ullah (born 1967), Bangladesh
Norman Foster (born 1935), UK
Yona Friedman (1923–2020), Hungary/France
Maxwell Fry (1899–1987), UK
Buckminster Fuller (1895–1983), US
Ignazio Gardella (1905–1999), Italy
Antoni Gaudí (1852–1926), Spain
Giuli Gegelia (born 1942), Georgia
Frank Gehry (born 1929), Canada/USA
Haralamb H. Georgescu (1908–1977), Romania/USA
Heydar Ghiai (1922–1985), Iran
Cass Gilbert (1859–1934), US
Moisei Ginzburg (1892–1946), Belarus/USSR
Romaldo Giurgola (1920–2016), Italy/USA/Australia
Hansjörg Göritz (born 1959), Germany
Bruce Goff (1904–1982), US
Ernő Goldfinger (1902–1987), Hungary/UK
Teodoro Gonzalez de Leon (1926–2016), Mexico
Bertram Goodhue (1869–1924), US
Ferdinand Gottlieb (1919–2007), Germany/USA
Noemí Goytia (born 1936), Argentina
Giorgio Grassi (born 1935), Italy
Michael Graves (1934–2015), US
Charles Sumner Greene (1868–1957), US 
Henry Mather Greene (1870–1954), US
Jules Gregory (1920–1985), US
Vittorio Gregotti (1927–2020), Italy
Walter Burley Griffin (1876–1937), US
Sir Nicholas Grimshaw (born 1939), UK
Walter Gropius (1883–1969), Germany
Victor Gruen (1903–1980), Austria
Hector Guimard (1867–1942), France

H–K

Charles Haertling (1928–1984), US 
William John Hale (1862–1929), UK
Robert Bell Hamilton (1892–1948), Australia
Halfdan M. Hanson (1884–1952), US
Bashirul Haq (1942–2020), Bangladesh
Hugo Häring (1882–1958), Germany
David M. Harper (born 1953), US
Wallace Harrison (1895–1981), US
Francis R. Heakes (1858–1930), Canada
John Hejduk (1929–2000), US
Herman Hertzberger (born 1932), Netherlands
Heinz Hess (1922–1992), Germany
Fernando Higueras (1930–2008), Spain
Ludwig Hilberseimer (1885–1967), German
Herbert Hirche (1910–2002), Germany
Harold Frank Hoar (1907–1976), UK
Florence Fulton Hobson (1881–1978), Ireland
Charles Holden (1875–1960), UK
Hans Hollein (1934–2014), Austria
Raymond Hood (1881–1934), US
Sir Michael Hopkins (born 1935), UK, 1994 RIBA Gold Medal winner
Victor Horta (1861–1947), Belgium
Edith Hughes (1888–1971), UK
A. R. Hye (1919–2008), Pakistan
Friedensreich Hundertwasser (1928–2000), Austria
Wilbur R. Ingalls, Jr. (1923–1997), US
Muzharul Islam (1923–2012), Bangladesh
Arata Isozaki (born 1931), Japan
Arne Jacobsen (1902–1971), Denmark
Hugh Newell Jacobsen (born 1929), US
Helmut Jahn (1940–2021), Germany/US
Peter Janesch (born 1953), Hungary
Benno Janssen (1874–1964), US
Pierre Jeanneret (1896–1967), Switzerland
Peder Vilhelm Jensen-Klint (1853–1930), Denmark
Jon Jerde (1940–2015), US
Philip Johnson (1906–2005), US
Clarence H. Johnston, Sr. (1859–1936), US
E. Fay Jones (1921–2004), US
Josep Maria Jujol (1879–1949), Spain
Ryszard Jurkowski (born 1945), Poland
Albert Kahn (1869–1942), US
Fazlur Rahman Khan (1929–1982), Bangladesh
Louis Kahn (1901/1902–1974), US
Maxwell M. Kalman (1906–2009), Canada
Mariam Kamara (born 1979), Niger
Louis Kamper (1861–1953), US
Jan Kaplický (1937–2009), Czech/UK
Katayama Tōkuma (1854–1917), Japan
Oskar Kaufmann (1873–1956), Hungary
Kendrick Bangs Kellogg (born 1934), US
Raymond M. Kennedy (1891–1976), US
Hugh T. Keyes (1888–1963), US
Nader Khalili (1936–2008), US
Edward Killingsworth (1917–2004), US
Charles Klauder (1872–1938), US
George Klenzendorff (1883–?), US
Michel de Klerk (1884–1923), Netherlands
Ralph Knott (1878–1929), UK
Austin Eldon Knowlton (1909–2003), US
Carl Koch (1912–1998), US
Hans Kollhoff (born 1946), Germany
Musa Konsulova (1921-2019), USSR, Ukraine
Rem Koolhaas (born 1944), Netherlands
Károly Kós (1883–1977), Hungary
Johannes Krahn (1908–1974), Germany
Piet Kramer (1881–1961), Netherlands
Léon Krier (born 1946), Luxembourg
Kisho Kurokawa (1934–2007), Japan
Edgar-Johan Kuusik (1888–1974), Estonia
Ivan Sergeyevich Kuznetsov (1867–1942), Russia

L–M

Thomas W. Lamb (1871–1942), US
G. Albert Lansburgh (1876–1969), US
Eve Laron OAM (1931–2009), Australia
Henning Larsen (1925–2013), Denmark
Sir Denys Lasdun (1914–2001), UK
Vilhelm Lauritzen (1894–1984), Denmark
John Lautner (1911–1994), US
Ricardo Legorreta (1931–2011), Mexico
William Lescaze (1896–1969), US
Jan Letzel (1880–1925), Czechoslovakia
Amanda Levete (born 1955), UK
Sigurd Lewerentz (1885–1975), Sweden
Liang Sicheng (1901–1972), China
Adalberto Libera (1903–1963), Italy
Daniel Libeskind (born 1946), Poland/USA
João Filgueiras Lima (1931–2014), Brazil
Maya Lin (born 1959), US
El Lissitzky (1890–1941), Russia
Gordon W. Lloyd (1832–1905), US
Leandro Locsin  (1928–1994), Philippines
Elmar Lohk (1901–1963), Estonia
Adolf Loos (1870–1933), Austria/Czechoslovakia
Berthold Lubetkin (1901–1990), UK/USSR
Bill Lucas (1924–2001), Australia
Hans Luckhardt (1890–1954), Germany
Wassili Luckhardt (1889–1972), Germany
Owen Luder (born 1928), UK
Edwin Lutyens (1869–1944), UK
Ivar Lykke (born 1941), Norway
George Washington Maher (1864–1926), US
Fumihiko Maki (born 1928), Japan
Charles Rennie Mackintosh (1868–1928), UK
Imre Makovecz  (1935–2011), Hungary
Robert Mallet-Stevens (1886–1945), France
Angelo Mangiarotti (1921–2012), Italy
George R. Mann (1856–1939), US
Robert Matthew (1906–1975), UK
George D. Mason (1856–1948), US
Edward Maufe (1883–1974), UK
Bernard Maybeck (1862–1957), US
Wayne McAllister (1907–2000), US
Raymond McGrath (1903–1977), UK/Ireland
Roy Mason (1938–1996), US
François Massau, Belgium 
Richard Meier (born 1934), US
Konstantin Melnikov (1890–1974), USSR
Erich Mendelsohn (1887–1953), Germany
Paulo Mendes da Rocha (1928–2021), Brazil
Henry Mercer (1856–1930), US
Geoffrey Harley Mewton (1905–1998), Australia
Johan van der Mey (1878–1949), Netherlands
Hannes Meyer (1889–1954), Switzerland
Giovanni Michelucci (1891–1990), Italy
Ludwig Mies van der Rohe (1886–1969), Germany/USA
Andrés Mignucci (born 1957), Puerto Rico
Vlado Milunić (born 1941), Czech Republic
James Rupert Miller (1869–1946), US
Dom Mintoff (1916–2012), Malta
F. A. Minuth, American, New York City
Hadi Mirmiran (1945–2006), Iran
Enric Miralles (1955–2000), Spain
Antonio Miró Montilla (born 1937), Puerto Rico
Samuel Mockbee (1944–2001)
Erik Møller (1909–2002)
Rafael Moneo (born 1937), Spain
Roger Montgomery (1925–2003), US
Adolfo Moran (born 1953), Spain
Riccardo Morandi (1902–1989), Italy
Luigi Moretti (1907–1973), Italy
Arthur Cotton Moore (born 1935), US
Charles Willard Moore (1925–1993), US
Lester S. Moore (1871–1924), US
Julia Morgan (1872–1957), US
Raymond Moriyama (born 1929), Canada
Eric Owen Moss (born 1943), US
Michel Mossessian (born 1959), France/UK
Frederick Augustus Muhlenberg (1887–1980), US
Glenn Murcutt (born 1936), Australia
C. F. Møller (1898–1988), Denmark
Barton Myers (born 1934), Canada

N–R

Robert Natus (1890–1950)
Pier Luigi Nervi (1891–1979), Italy
Peter Newell (1916–2010), Australia
Richard Neutra (1892–1970)
Ngo Viet Thu (1926–2000), Vietnam
Oscar Niemeyer (1907–2012)
Enamul Karim Nirjhar (born 1962), Bangladesh
Oscar Nitzchke (1900–1991)
Percy Erskine Nobbs (1875–1964)
Samuel Tilden Norton (1877–1959)
Ellice Nosworthy (1897–1972), Australia
Jean Nouvel (born 1945)
Martin Nyrop (1849–1921), Denmark
Gyo Obata (1923–2022)
Samuel Oghale Oboh (born 1971) Canada / Nigeria
John J. O'Malley (1915–1970), US
Yafes Osman (born 1946), Bangladesh
Frei Otto (1925–2015)
J.J.P. Oud (1890–1963)
Félix Candela Outeriño (1910–1997), Spain/Mexico
Paul Paget (1901–1985)
Henry (Harry) Paley (1859–1946)
Mustapha Khalid Palash (born 1963), Bangladesh
Mihály (Michael) Párkányi (1924–1991) Hungary
John and Donald Parkinson (1861–1945)
John Pawson (born 1949)
Arthur Peabody (1858–1942)
I. M. Pei (1917–2019)
César Pelli (1926–2019)
Hubert Petschnigg (1913–1997)
Frits Peutz (1896–1974)
Timothy L. Pflueger (1892–1946)
Renzo Piano (born 1937), Italy
Stjepan Planić (1900–1980)
Jože Plečnik (1872–1957)
Hans Poelzig (1869–1936)
Gino Pollini (1903–1991), Italy
James Polshek (born 1930)
Donald Perry Polsky (born 1928)
Gio Ponti (1891–1979)
John Russell Pope (1874–1937)
John Portman (1924–2017)
Christian de Portzamparc (born 1944), France
George B. Post (1837–1913), US
Fernand Pouillon (1912-1986), France
Henry Price (1867–1944)
Alain Provost (born 1938)
Freeman A. Pretzinger
William Gray Purcell (1880–1965), US
C. W. Rapp (1860–1926), US
George L. Rapp (1878–1941), US
Isaac Rapp (1854–1933), US
Ralph Rapson (1914–2008)
Steen Eiler Rasmussen (1898–1990)
Antonin Raymond (1888–1976), Japan/USA
Affonso Eduardo Reidy (1909–1964), Brazil
Sir Charles Herbert Reilly (1874–1948)
Sir Albert Richardson (1880–1964)
Gerrit Rietveld (1888–1964)
Isabel Roberts (1871–1955), US
Harry G. Robinson III (born 1942)
Kevin Roche (1922–2019)
Ernesto Nathan Rogers (1909–1969)
Richard Rogers (1933–2021)
Mario Romañach  (1917–1984), Havana, Cuba
Aldo Rossi (1931–1997), Italy
Wirt C. Rowland (1878–1946)
Paul Rudolph (1918–1997)
Robert Tor Russell (1888–1972)

S–Z

Eero Saarinen (1910–1961), Finland
Eliel Saarinen (1873–1950), Finland
Eugen Sacharias (1906–2002)
Moshe Safdie (born 1938)
Paul Saintenoy (1862–1952)
Rogelio Salmona (1929–2007), Spain-Colombia
Guðjón Samúelsson (1887–1950), Iceland
João Santa-Rita (born 1960)
Carlos A. Santos-Viola (1912–1994)
Louis Sauer (born 1928)
Carlo Scarpa (1906–1978)
Hans Scharoun (1893–1972)
Rudolf Schindler (1887–1953)
Elisabeth Scott (1898–1972), UK
Frederic Schwartz (1951–2014)
Paul Schmitthenner (1884–1972)
Alexey Shchusev (1873–1949)
Margarete Schütte-Lihotzky (1897–2000)
Giles Gilbert Scott (1880–1960)
Harry Seidler (1923–2006)
Richard Seifert (1910–2001)
Joseph Lluís Sert (1902–1983)
H. Craig Severance (1879–1941)
Hooshang Seyhoun (1920–2014), Iran
Richard Sheppard (1910-1982)
Vladimir Shukhov (1853–1939)
Claudio Silvestrin (born 1954)
Scott Simons (born 1952), US
Alvaro Siza (born 1933), Portugal
Howard Dwight Smith (1886–1958)
George Washington Smith (1876–1930)
Alison Smithson (1928–1993)
Peter Smithson (1923–2003)
Charles B. J. Snyder (1860–1945), US
Paolo Soleri (1919–2013), Italy
Alejandro de la Sota (1913–1996)
Eduardo Souto de Moura (born 1952), Portugal
Albert Speer (1905–1981)
Basil Spence (1907–1976)
Johann Otto von Spreckelsen (1929–1987)
Sheila Sri Prakash (born 1955), India
William L. Steele (1875–1949), US
Andrew Steiner (1908–2009), Czechoslovak-American
Rudolf Steiner (1861–1925)
Joseph Allen Stein (1912–2001), US, India
Robert A.M. Stern (born 1939)
John Calvin Stevens (1855–1940), US
Sir James Stirling (1926–1992)
Edward Durrell Stone (1902–1978)
James Strutt (1924–2008), Canada
Joseph Sunlight (1889–1978)
Roger Taillibert (1926–2019)
Benedetta Tagliabue (born 1963), Italy, co-founder of EMBT 
Alexander Tamanyan (1878–1936), Armenia
Kenzo Tange (1913–2005)
Bruno Taut (1880–1938)
Max Taut (1884–1967)
Giuseppe Terragni (1904–1943)
Quinlan Terry (born 1937)
Heinrich Tessenow (1876–1950), German
Benjamin C. Thompson (1918–2002)
Edmund von Trompowsky (1851–1919), Latvia 
Horace Trumbauer (1868–1938)
Bernard Tschumi (born 1944)
Gilbert Stanley Underwood (1890–1960)
Jørn Utzon (1918–2008), Denmark
Vann Molyvann (1926–2017), Cambodia
François Valentiny (born 1953), Luxembourg
William van Alen (1883–1954)
Henry Van de Velde (1863–1957)
Henri van Dievoet (1869–1931)
Antoine Varlet (1893–1940)
Robert Venturi (1925–2018)
Miguel Vila Luna (1943–2005), Dominican Republic
Carlos Raúl Villanueva (1900–1975)
Rafael Viñoly (born 1944)
Roland Wank (1898–1970)
Paul Waterhouse (1861–1924), UK
Carlo Weber (1934–2014)
W. H. Weeks (1864–1936)
Carl Westman (1866–1936)
Paul Williams (1894–1980)
Clough Williams-Ellis (1883–1978)
Jan Wils (1891–1972)
George J. Wimberly (1914–1996)
James Wines (born 1932), US
Geoffrey Wooding (1954–2010)
Lebbeus Woods (1940–2012), US
Frank Lloyd Wright (1867–1959), US
Marcellus E. Wright Sr. (1881–1962), US
Minoru Yamasaki (1912–1986)
F. R. S. Yorke (1906–1962), UK
Jean-François Zevaco (1916–2003)
Milan Zloković (1898–1965)
Peter Zumthor (born 1943), Switzerland

21st-century architects

A–M

Adolfo Moran
Alexandre Chan
Andy Martin (architect) (born 1963)
Antonio Citterio (born 1950), Italy
Arif Hasan (born 1943), Pakistan
Atsushi Kitagawara (born 1951), Japan
Basil Al Bayati (born 1946), UK
Bernard Khoury (born in 1969), Lebanon
Bjarke Ingels (born 1974), Denmark
Cantarutti Robby (born 1966), Italy
Carol Ross Barney (born 1949), US
Christina Cho, Australia
Christoph Ingenhoven (born 1960), Germany
Christopher Charles Benninger (born 1942), India
Craig W. Hartman
Daniel Libeskind (born 1946, Poland), US
David Adjaye (born 1966), Tanzania
David M. Harper (born 1953)
David Randall Hertz (born 1960), US
Dominique Gauzin-Müller (born 1960), France
Dy Proeung, Cambodia
Eric Corey Freed
Erick van Egeraat (born 1956), Netherlands
Eugene Pandala (born 1954), India
Greg Lynn
Gregory Henriquez
Günay Erdem (born 1978, Bulgaria), Turkey
Hafeez Contractor (born 1950), India
H. R. Hiegel
Hidetsugu Aneha (born 1957), Japan
Hossein Amanat (born 1942), Iran
Ivan Harbour (born 1962), UK
James Garrison (born 1963), US
Jeanne Gang (born 1964), US
Jimenez Lai 
Jing Liu
Jun'ya Ishigami (born 1974), Japan
Kamel Mahadin (born 1954), Jordan
Kazuyo Sejima (born 1956), Japan
Kees Christiaanse (born 1953), Netherlands
Keith Griffiths (born 1954), UK
Kengo Kuma
Kevin Kennon
Lise Anne Couture (born 1959), Canada
Marco Casagrande (born 1971), Finland
Mariam Kamara (born 1979), Niger
Massimiliano Fuksas, Italy
Maya Lin, US
Michael Middleton Dwyer, US
Michael Green, Canada
Michel Abboud (born 1977), Lebanon
Nabil Gholam (born 1962), Lebanon
Norman Foster, (born 1935), UK
Odile Decq, (born 1955), France
Olajumoke Adenowo (born 1968), Nigeria
Peter Eisenman (born 1932), United States
Peter Exley, US
Pouya Khazaeli (born 1975), Iran
Rafiq Azam, Bangladesh
Rem Koolhaas (born 1944), Netherlands
Roger Duffy
Ron Arad (born 1951), Israel
Sunita Kohli (born 1946), India
Sean Godsell (born 1960), Australia
Shigeru Ban (born 1957), Japan
Sir Terry Farrell, UK
Sou Fujimoto (born 1971), Japan
Stefano Boeri, Italy
Stephan Braunfels (born 1950), Germany
Steven Holl (born 1947), US 
Sue Courtenay, Belize
Sunay Erdem (born 1971, Bulgaria), Turkey
Tatiana Bilbao, Mexico
T.J. Gottesdiener
Terence Conran (1931–2020, United Kingdom)
Thom Mayne
Thomas Doerr (born 1964), US
Thomas Herzog
Tom Kundig
Tony Fretton (born 1945), UK
Toshiko Mori, Japan
Toyo Ito (born 1941), Japan
Wiel Arets (born 1955), Netherlands
William McDonough
Zaha Hadid (1950–2016), UK

N-Z

Florent Nédélec
Enamul Karim Nirjhar
Samuel Oghale Oboh (born 1971), Canada  /  Nigeria
Liz Ogbu
Neri Oxman
Satyendra Pakhale (born 1967), India
Mustapha Khalid Palash
Bimal Patel (born 1961), India
Thomas Phifer
Renzo Piano, Italy
Dimitris Potiropoulos
Antoine Predock
Joshua Prince-Ramus
Philippe Rahm
Richard Rogers, UK
Fernando Romero, Mexico 
Lawrence Scarpa
Kazuyo Sejima (born 1956), Japan
Adrian Smith
Galia Solomonoff
Sheila Sri Prakash (born 1955), India
Paul Steelman (born 1955), US
Marshall Strabala
Sergei Tchoban (born 1962), Russian-born architect
Jack Travis (born 1952), US
Victor Vechersky (born 1958), Ukraine
Ross Wimer
Wang Shu (born 1963), China
Jörg Stollmann, Germany
Wilfried van Winden (born 1955)
Gert Wingårdh (born 1951), Sweden
Jun Xia, China
Ken Yeang (born 1948), Malaysia

Mythological/fictional architects
Several architects occur in worldwide mythology, including Daedalus, builder of the Labyrinth, in Greek myth. In the Bible, Nimrod is considered the creator of the Tower of Babel, and King Solomon built Solomon's Temple with the assistance of the architect Hiram. In Hinduism, the palaces of the gods were built by the architect and artisan Vivasvat. Moreover, Indian epic Mahabharata cites amazing work by architect 'Maya.'

Architects also occur in modern fiction.  Examples include Howard Roark, protagonist in Ayn Rand's The Fountainhead; Bloody Stupid Johnson, a parody of Capability Brown who appears in Terry Pratchett's Discworld novels; and Slartibartfast, designer of planets in Douglas Adams's The Hitchhiker's Guide to the Galaxy.  Basil Al Bayati's novel The Age of Metaphors on the theme of Metaphoric Architecture is also replete with fictional architects.  The main characters of Sa'ad, Shiymaa and Sa'im are all architects, as are a number of others who appear throughout the book.

Many films have included central characters who are architects, including Henry Fonda's character "Juror 8" (Davis) in 12 Angry Men (1957), Charles Bronson's character in Death Wish (1974), John Cassavetes' character in Tempest (1982), Wesley Snipes' character in "Jungle Fever" (1991), Christopher Lloyd's character in Suburban Commando (1991),  Tom Hanks' character in Sleepless in Seattle (1993), David Strathairn's character in The River Wild (1994), Michael J. Fox's character in The Frighteners (1996), Michael Keaton's character in White Noise (2005) and Jeremy Irons' character in High-Rise (2015).

In television, Mike Brady, father of The Brady Bunch, is an architect; as is Wilbur Post, owner of Mister Ed; Ted Mosby, from How I Met Your Mother; and David Vincent from The Invaders. Adam Cartwright of Bonanza was an architectural engineer with a university education who designed the sprawling familial ranch-house on the Ponderosa Ranch. The character George Costanza pretends to be an architect named "Art Vandelay" in Seinfeld. Architect Halvard Solness is the protagonist of Henrick Ibsen's 1892 play The Master Builder.

Lists of architects by country

See also

List of architects of supertall buildings
List of architectural historians
List of architecture firms
List of women architects

References

Further reading
James Steele (1997), Architecture Today, Phaidon Press.

External links
Famous architects
The Historyscoper - architects
Famous Architects In Pakistan

 
Lists of people by occupation